Sabhaapathy is a 2021 Indian Tamil-language comedy film directed by debutant R. Srinivasa Rao and produced by R K Entertainment. The film stars Santhanam and Preeti Verma in the lead roles and the music is composed by Sam C. S. The film released theatrically on 19 November 2021 to moderate reviews from critics but ended up as a failure in the box office. The satellite and streaming rights were sold to Colors Tamil and Amazon Prime Video and Aha respectively.

Cast

Soundtrack

The soundtrack and score was composed by Sam C. S.

Reception 

Siby Jeyya of India Herald wrote, "Sabhaapathy is one of Santhanam's better films as a leading man." Sudhir Srinivasan of The New Indian Express wrote, "Sabhaapathy, begins with the deep voice of a narrator who identifies himself as ‘vidhi’, claiming to ‘play’ with ‘innocent’ people like Sabhaapathy. I imagine that on the day I watched Sabhaapathy, Mr Vidhi had chosen me for his game." Suganth of The Times of India gave a rating of 2.5 out on 5 and wrote, "Sabhaapathy is a middling affair. Like a dream that eludes you once you wake up, you forget it the moment you step out of the theatre." Sify gave a rating of 2 out on 5 and wrote as "sabhaapathy is a below-average comedy entertainer that can be watched for the hilarious comedy combination between  Santhanam and the MS Baskar!" and the final verdict as "Tedious". Ranjani krishnakumar of Film Companion wrote, "Sabhaapathy is a test of patience, even if you generally enjoy Santhanam's brand of humour."

References

External links 
 

2020s Tamil-language films
2021 comedy-drama films
Indian comedy-drama films
Films scored by Sam C. S.